Jeppe may refer to several articles.

Places 
 Jeppe, Johannesburg, South Africa, named after Julius Jeppe; see:
 Jeppestown, Gauteng
 Jeppestown South, Gauteng
 Jeppe High School for Girls
 Jeppe High School for Boys

People 
Jeppe (name)

Fiction 
 Jeppe of the Hill (da. Jeppe paa Bierget), a play by Ludvig Holberg, 1722.
 Jeppe på bjerget (a film version of the play)
 Jeppe: The Cruel Comedy (an opera based on the play)